Timelord is the eighth studio album by Scottish musician Momus. It was released in October 1993 through Creation Records in Europe and Nippon Columbia in Japan.

Background 
Timelord has been described by Momus as "the album that shot itself in the foot". Momus' then-girlfriend, Shazna, a Bangladesh-born 17-year-old, had been forced into an arranged marriage and kept apart from him. The album was recorded as a response, in a period during which it appeared that their relationship would end permanently. Much of the album focuses on themes of love and heartbreak, but also of illness and death, reflective of the AIDS epidemic sweeping Europe at the time. Momus and Shazna were married the following year after assistance from the British High Commission.

Timelord was the first Momus album to be released on a major label, namely Nippon Columbia, who oversaw the album's release in Japan; it was also Momus' final album on Creation Records, after which he was signed to Cherry Red Records.

The album's sleeve is a portrait of Momus clad in knight's armour, photographed by notable French artists Pierre et Gilles.

Timelord was reissued in 2018 as part of the Create 2 - Recreate compilation, alongside Hippopotamomus and Voyager. This reissue included three bonus tracks and liner notes by Anthony Reynolds.

Reception 

Timelord received mixed to positive reviews from the British press. NME rated the album 7/10, with critic Stephen Dalton praising Momus' "dry wit, effortless diversity, and enduring fondness for pop" but noting that the album felt "emaciated", adding that the album focused heavily on darker themes of aging, death, and illness. Select also noted the album's darker themes, stating that it was a welcome change from Momus' more humorous writing. Vox critic Steve Malins rated the album 6/10, calling it variously "soothing" and "chilling". Melody Maker commented that, although the album focused on more negative themes than his usual work, Momus offers a glimpse of hope in the album's closing track, "Breathless". AllMusic critic Steve Huey panned the album as inconsistent, but noted that it "can't be divorced from [the] context" of Momus' tumultuous personal life.

Upon the album's reissue in 2018, it garnered further favourable reviews. Louder Than War critic Craig Chaligne commented that the album had "a certain timelessness", and that "Momus’ soulful delivery masks a rather bleak set of lyrics".

Track listing

Personnel 

 All songs written by Nick Currie
 All songs produced, programmed, recorded, and engineered by Momus
 Design by Anthony Sweeney
 Cover photography by Pierre et Gilles

References 

1993 albums
Momus (musician) albums